Norma Ruiz Izquierdo (Madrid, June 9, 1982) is a Spanish actress and dancer known for playing Bárbara Ortiz in Yo soy Bea.

Biography 
Norma is the youngest of four sisters. As a child she aspired to be a professional dancer. One of her sisters, a dance teacher, taught her to dance sevillanas when she was four years old and at the age of eight she entered a dance school. It was in the company of Miliki and Rita Irasema where she performed her first work, El flautista de Hamelin, which she performed for a year. She then entered the conservatory to learn Spanish dance. Antonio Canales and José Racero chose her for some shows, performing -for example- at the Palau Sant Jordi in Barcelona.

At the age of 19, an injury took her away from the world of dance, although she decided to continue dancing for a while in musicals to pay for her acting career. She then decided to enroll in the TAI University Arts Center in Madrid. In her last year she got the opportunity, thanks to the direction students of the same center, to participate in the cheapest movie of the Spanish cinema: La fiesta, which only cost 6000 euros in 2003. Later she participated in the independent The tester, by Fernando Núñez Herrera. In 2010, she released La herencia Valdemar and the comedy Tensión sexual no resuelta and in 2011 La herencia Valdemar II: La sombra prohibida.

She also participated in plays and musicals such as Sonrisas y lágrimas, Al compás son seis, Aires tradicionales, Esta noche hay que matar a Franco, Stabat mater, Por los pelos and El tiempo y los Conway.

In television, she has participated in the series Aquí no hay quién viva (Antena 3, 2005), La sopa boba (Antena 3, 2004) or Cuéntame cómo pasó (La 1, 2006). Although her best known television roles have been in El auténtico Rodrigo Leal (Antena 3, 2005), Yo soy Bea (Telecinco, 2006-2008), Gavilanes (Antena 3, 2010-2011), Parejología 3x2 (Telecinco, 2011), Supercharly (Telecinco, 2011).

Between 2012 and 2013 she worked in Telecinco's Frágiles. Also, she was part of the cast of two telefilms in 2011 about Carmen Cervera in which she gave life to Blanca Cuesta and Rocío Dúrcal, volver a verte where she played Rocío Dúrcal, after the role was rejected by the daughter of the artist Carmen Morales due to discrepancies with the script, both in Telecinco.

In 2014, she joined Cuatro's afternoon series, Ciega a citas, and in 2015 in the Antena 3 series Algo que celebrar.

In 2016 she starred in the series El hombre de tu vida alongside José Mota in La 1. In 2018 and 2019 she played Bárbara in La que se avecina.

Personal life 
She is in a relationship with Bosco James. In January 2021, she announced her pregnancy on her Instagram account. Her daughter Alma was born on April 18, 2021.

Dance and Art 

 Sevillanas classes, taught by her sister.
 Dance classes in the company of Miliki and Rita Irasema.
 Real Conservatorio Profesional de Danza de Madrid, where she graduated in Dance.
 Escuela Superior de Artes y Espectáculos TAI, where she graduated in interpretation.
 School of Interpretation "La Guindalera".

Career

Dancer 

 Tour with Miliki and Rita Irasema. El flautista de Hamelin. (1988/1989)
 Shows of the Real Conservatorio Profesional de Danza de Madrid
 Several shows with Antonio Canales.
 Several shows with José Racero.
 Worked with the dancer Luisillo in several productions.
 Dancer in the Sonrisas y lágrimas (2000)
 Dancer in the flamenco musical Al compás son seis (2001)

Actress

Theater 

 Una despedida de muerte
 Tr3s
 El tiempo y los Conway
 Lope de Aguirre, traidor
 La gaviota
 Aires tradicionales
 Esta noche hay que matar a Franco
 Stabat Mater
 Por los pelos (2008/2010)
 El poder de la sangre (2011/-)

Cinema 

 La fiesta (2003), as Luna, protagonist.
 The Tester (2004), as Rebeca, protagonist.
 Tensión sexual no resuelta (2010), as Jazz, protagonist.
 La herencia Valdemar, (2010), as Ana, supporting actress.
 La herencia Valdemar II: La sombra prohibida, (2011), as Ana, supporting actress
 Los Futbolísimos, (2018), as Alicia, main character.

Television

Telefilms 

 Tita Cervera. La Baronesa (2011) as Blanca Cuesta, secondary.
 Rocío Dúrcal. Volver a verte (2011) as Rocío Dúrcal, protagonist.

Television 

 El programa de Ana Rosa (2016) guest.

Awards and nominations 
2007 Actors' Union Awards

 Nomination for Best Newcomer Actress for Yo soy Bea.

2007 Kapital Awards

 Award for best performance for Por los pelos.
 Young Talent Award 2012 at the Comedy Film Festival of Tarazona and Moncayo.

References

External links 
 Norma Ruiz on IMDb

Actors from Madrid
Spanish film actresses
Spanish stage actresses
Spanish television actresses
Living people
1982 births